

A merchant is a businessperson who trades in commodities.

Merchant or Merchants may also refer to:

Places 
 Merchant, Virginia, an unincorporated community
 Merchant's House, Shepton Mallet, Somerset, England
 Merchant Hall, Bristol, England
 Merchant Hotel, a five-star luxury hotel in Belfast, Northern Ireland
 Merchants Building, Detroit, Michigan; on the National Register of Historic Places
 Merchant Tower, Campbellsville, Kentucky; on the National Register of Historic Places
 Merchants Bridge, a rail bridge in St. Louis, Missouri

People 
 Merchant (surname)
 Merchant W. Huxford (1798-1877), American physician, politician and mayor of Fort Wayne, Indiana

Companies 
 Merchants Insurance Group, an insurance company based in Buffalo, New York
 Merchants Trust, a large British investment trust
 Merchant International Group, a privately owned British strategic research and corporate intelligence company
 Merchants Transportation Company, a defunct American shipping firm

Literature 
 The Merchant (fairy tale), a 1634 Italian literary tale by Giambattista Basile

Sports 
 Norwich Merchants, a Canadian junior hockey team
 Ajax Merchants, a defunct Canadian junior hockey team